Gabin Delguel (born 20 January 2001) is a French professional footballer who plays as a leftback for Championnat National 2 club Bergerac.

Professional career
Delguel made his professional debut for Niort in a 2–2 draw with Paris FC on 26 September 2020. He made a second Ligue 2 appearance later the same season, coming on as a substitute for Bilal Boutobba in the 2–1 win against Pau on 20 February 2021. Delguel signed for Championnat National 2 club Bergerac ahead of the 2021–22 season.

References

External links
 
 Chamois Niortais Profile

Living people
2001 births
People from Rochefort, Charente-Maritime
French footballers
Association football fullbacks
Chamois Niortais F.C. players
Ligue 2 players
Championnat National 3 players
Sportspeople from Charente-Maritime
Footballers from Nouvelle-Aquitaine